The 2016 Stanley Cup Final was the championship series of the National Hockey League's (NHL) 2015–16 season, and the culmination of the 2016 Stanley Cup playoffs. The Eastern Conference champion Pittsburgh Penguins defeated the Western Conference champion San Jose Sharks four games to two to win their fourth championship in franchise history. Penguins captain Sidney Crosby was awarded the Conn Smythe Trophy as the most valuable player of the playoffs.

The Penguins finished with more points than the Sharks during the regular season, giving them home ice advantage in the series. The series began on May 30 and concluded on June 12. This was the first Final since 2007 to feature a team making their Final debut. This was the first playoff meeting between teams from Pittsburgh and the Bay Area since the Penguins swept the Oakland Seals in the 1970 Stanley Cup Quarterfinals.

The Eastern Conference had home-ice advantage in consecutive seasons for the first time since the 2004 and 2006 Final (the 2004-05 season, and consequently the 2005 Final, were not played due to a lockout).

For the first time since 2006, a new scheduling format was instituted for the Final. In previous years, the Final was played on a Wednesday–Saturday-Monday scheme (with a few games being played on Friday). However, the league changed its scheduling to ensure an extra day off for both teams. The extra off day, along with the designated travel day, would take place after games 2, 4, 5, and 6 in subsequent finals. This scheduling change was necessary as a result of the NBA instituting a new scheduling format for its championship series that went into effect beginning in 2016.

Paths to the Finals

Pittsburgh Penguins

The Penguins had made the playoffs every year since their win in 2009, but hadn't won a single game in the conference finals in that span.

After losing to the Rangers in the playoffs for the second consecutive year, the Penguins made waves during the 2015 offseason, trading for forwards Phil Kessel and Nick Bonino, re-signing defenceman Olli Maatta and forward Bryan Rust, and signing centres Matt Cullen and Eric Fehr in free agency. General manager Jim Rutherford fired head coach Mike Johnston on December 12, 2015, after the team limped to a 15–10–3 start. Johnston was replaced with Wilkes-Barre/Scranton Penguins coach Mike Sullivan, who went 33–16–5 over the remainder of the season. The Penguins made three major trades before the trade deadline, acquiring defencemen Trevor Daley and Justin Schultz and forward Carl Hagelin. After goalie Marc-Andre Fleury suffered a concussion on April 2, the team turned to rookie Matt Murray for the final week of the regular season and the majority of the playoffs.

Pittsburgh finished with 104 points (48–26–8) in the regular season to finish second in the Metropolitan Division. Centre and team captain Sidney Crosby led the club in scoring during the regular season and finished third in the league with 85 points.

In the playoffs, the Penguins eliminated the New York Rangers in five games after losing to them in 2014 and 2015, the Presidents' Trophy-winning Washington Capitals in six games, and the defending conference champion Tampa Bay Lightning in seven games.

San Jose Sharks

This was San Jose's first Finals appearance in their 25-year history, becoming the first team to make their Finals debut since the 2006–07 Ottawa Senators.

During the offseason the Sharks hired former New Jersey Devils head coach Peter DeBoer to replace Todd McLellan and traded for former Kings backup goalie Martin Jones. San Jose also picked up defenceman Paul Martin and right wingers Joel Ward and Dainius Zubrus via free agency. Before the trade deadline, the Sharks acquired forward Nick Spaling, defenceman Roman Polak, and goalie James Reimer.

San Jose earned 98 points (46–30–6) to finish third in the Pacific Division. Centre Joe Thornton led the club in scoring with 82 points, and finished tied for fourth in the league, followed closely by centre and team captain Joe Pavelski with 78 points and defenceman Brent Burns with 75 points.

In the playoffs, San Jose avenged their 2014 loss to the Kings, a series in which they blew a 3–0 series lead, by defeating Los Angeles in five games. San Jose also eliminated the Nashville Predators in seven games, winning every home game in the series, and the St. Louis Blues in the Conference Final in six games.

Game summaries
 Number in parentheses represents the player's total goals or assists to that point of the entire four rounds of the playoffs

Game 1

Game 1 remained scoreless until Bryan Rust and Conor Sheary scored a minute apart for the Penguins midway through the first period. San Jose came back in the second period with a power play goal by Tomas Hertl at 3:02 and the tying goal by Patrick Marleau at 18:12. Despite 18 third-period Pittsburgh shots directed towards Martin Jones, the score remained tied at two until very late in the game, when Kris Letang found Nick Bonino wide open in front of the net to give the Penguins the lead. The Penguins held off the Sharks in the final minutes to win 3–2.

Game 2

Game 2 began with a scoreless first period which featured 11 Penguins shots and only six from the Sharks. Midway through the second period, a series of San Jose miscues led to a Pittsburgh goal. After Roman Polak nearly gave the puck away to Phil Kessel, Brenden Dillon was stripped by Carl Hagelin, who gave it to Nick Bonino for a tip-in by Kessel. The Sharks tied the game late in the third on a goal by Justin Braun, which sent the game into overtime. Early in overtime, a quick shot by Conor Sheary beat Martin Jones to give the Penguins a 2–1 win and 2–0 series lead.

Game 3

Ben Lovejoy started off the scoring in Game 3 at 5:29 of the first period, when his point shot deflected in off Roman Polak. The Sharks tied it at 9:34 on a Justin Braun goal. Midway through the second period, the Penguins took the lead back when Patric Hornqvist tipped in another Lovejoy point shot. In the third period, Nick Bonino high-sticked Joe Thornton, and in the dying seconds of the four-minute power play, Joel Ward fired a slap shot past Matt Murray to tie the game. In overtime, Joonas Donskoi roofed a tough-angle shot over Murray's shoulder for the game winner.

Game 4

At 7:36 of the first period, Phil Kessel took advantage of a poor Sharks line change and fired a shot that rebounded off Martin Jones and directly to Ian Cole, who scored his first playoff goal. This marked the seventh consecutive game in which the Penguins had scored first. In the second period, Sharks forward Melker Karlsson was called for interference against Eric Fehr, and on the ensuing power play, Evgeni Malkin tipped in a Kessel shot for the Penguins' second goal. During the third period, Karlsson scored to cut the deficit to one, but the Penguins regained a two-goal lead with 2:02 left when Eric Fehr beat Jones on a breakaway.

Game 5

Game 5 started quickly, with four goals scored in the first 5:06 of the game. Brent Burns gave the Sharks their first lead of the Final at 1:04, slipping it past Murray on the right post. San Jose scored again at 2:53, when Logan Couture deflected in a shot from Justin Braun. Less than two minutes later, Sharks forward Dainius Zubrus got called for delay of game after shooting the puck over the glass. On the ensuing power play, a Malkin shot deflected off Braun's skate and past Jones, cutting the deficit to 2–1. Less than a minute later, Brenden Dillon gave away the puck to Nick Bonino, who took a shot that was deflected in by Carl Hagelin. Later in the first period, during a Pittsburgh power play, a Phil Kessel wrist shot bounced off both posts but stayed out. Later in the period, Dillon passed down low for Couture who sauced a backhand pass to Karlsson, who scored to regain the lead for the Sharks. San Jose took just 15 shots in the second and third period combined, but Jones withstood a massive 46 shots from the Penguins to stave off elimination. Joe Pavelski provided an empty-net goal to force a sixth game.

Game 6

A power play drive from Brian Dumoulin started the scoring early in Game 6. During the first intermission, a tribute to Gordie Howe was played, as he died on June 10. San Jose tied it up in the second period when Logan Couture took a pass from Melker Karlsson and fired a shot past Murray. Just over a minute later, Pittsburgh regained the lead when a shot by Kris Letang ricocheted off Martin Jones and in. Despite facing elimination on home ice, the Sharks managed only two shots on goal in the third period, and an empty-net goal from Patric Hornqvist sealed the win for Pittsburgh. The Penguins won the fourth Stanley Cup in franchise history, clinching all four on the road.

Team rosters

Pittsburgh Penguins

San Jose Sharks

Stanley Cup engraving

The 2016 Stanley Cup was presented to Penguins captain Sidney Crosby by NHL Commissioner Gary Bettman following the Penguins' 3–1 win over the Sharks in Game 6. 

The following Penguins players and staff had their names engraved on the Stanley Cup

2015–16 Pittsburgh Penguins

Engraving notes
Pittsburgh broke the 1938 Chicago Black Hawks' record of eight with ten U.S.-born players on a Stanley Cup winning team: Nick Bonino, Ian Cole, Matt Cullen, Brian Dumoulin, Phil Kessel, Ben Lovejoy, Kevin Porter, Bryan Rust, Conor Sheary, and Jeff Zatkoff. An 11th American, Beau Bennett was not included on the cup.

Player Notes
 #30 Matt Murray (G) – played in 13 and dressed for 32 regular-season games, and started 22 playoff games. He won a rookie-tying 15 playoff games – automatically included on the cup for playing in the Finals
 #4 Justin Schultz (D) – played 45 games for Edmonton and 18 regular-season games and 15 playoff games for Pittsburgh – automatically included on the Cup for playing in the Finals
 #9 Pascal Dupuis (RW) – only played 18 games and forced to retire on Dec. 8 because of several blood clots – given an injury exemption and included on the Cup
 #11 Kevin Porter (C) – played 41 regular-season games, but missed the last 19 and all of the playoffs due to an ankle surgery – automatically included on the Cup for playing at least 41 regular-season games
 #37 Jeff Zatkoff (G) – played in 14 games and dressed for 59 regular-season games, and dressed for the first seven playoff games. With Murray and Fleury both injured, Zatkoff started the first two games of the playoffs, winning one and losing one – qualified for dressing for at least 41 regular-season games
 Pittsburgh included the head team physician for the first time on the Stanley Cup. In 1991, 1992, and 2009 Dr. Charles Burke was not engraved on the Stanley Cup.

Included in the team picture, but left off the Stanley Cup
 #19 Beau Bennett (RW) – played 33 regular-season games and one playoff game. Bennett missed 48 regular seasons and 15 playoffs Games including the finals injured.  Bennett did play 1 game in the Conference Finals. No injury exemption was requested.
 #51 Derrick Pouliot (D) – played 22 regular season and two playoff games – did not qualify
 #40 Oskar Sundqvist (C) – played 18 regular season and two playoff games – did not qualify 
 #23 Scott Wilson (LW) – played 24 regular season games – did not qualify
 #40  Tristan Jarry (G) – dressed for the first two playoff games, due to Matt Murray, and Marc-Andre Fleury being injured – did not qualify
All players listed above received Stanley Cup rings.
 Sergei Gonchar (Defense Coach), Danny Kroll (Asst. Equipment Manager)

Scouts
Gilles Meloche was the goaltending coach for Pittsburgh's Cup wins in 1991, 1992, and 2009. His role was changed to Special Assignment Scout, so his name was left off the Stanley Cup in 2016. However, he was awarded his fourth Stanley Cup ring. Other scouts left off the Cup but got rings were pro scouts Al Santili and Ryan Bowness, amateur scouts Colin Alexander, Scott Bell, Brain Fitzgerald, Luc Gauthier, Frank Golden, Jay Heinbuck, Wayne Meier, Ron Pyette, Casey Torres, and Warren Young, and European scouts Patrick Alivin, Petri Pakaslahi, and Tommy Westlund. Many other members of Pittsburgh's staff were also left off the Cup but still received championship rings.

Players who were part of the 2009 and 2016 Stanley Cup wins:
 Engraved as players twice: Sidney Crosby, Marc-Andre Fleury, Chris Kunitz, Kris Letang, Evgeni Malkin, and Pascal Dupuis (retired on Dec. 8, 2015)
 Engraved as player once: Ben Lovejoy (included on 2009 team picture but did not qualify to be on Cup that year)
 Engraved twice (including once as a player — in 2009): Bill Guerin (assistant general manager in 2016)

Television and radio
In the U.S., the Final was split between NBC and NBCSN. NBCSN aired two games of the series while NBC aired the other five (if necessary). On May 27, NBC Sports announced that if the series was tied at 1-1 entering Game 3, then it would have aired on NBC and Game 4 televised on NBCSN. However, if one team led 2–0 (as this eventually happened), Game 3 moved to NBCSN and then Game 4 on NBC. The games were broadcast nationally on radio via the NBC Sports Radio network.

In Canada, the series aired on CBC Television (through Hockey Night in Canada'', as produced by Sportsnet through a brokerage agreement) in English, and TVA Sports in French.

Beginning with this series, the NHL revised the schedule of the Stanley Cup Finals. From 2006 to 2015, the Finals typically followed a Monday–Wednesday–Saturday format. However, the NHL decided to alter the format so as to give teams an extra day off upon traveling from one city to another. These two-day layovers took place after Games 2, 4, 5, and 6. The National Basketball Association's championship series followed a similar format beginning that year as well to avoid head-to-head competition against the NHL's Cup Finals.

References

Navigation

Stanley Cup Finals
Stanley Cup Finals
 
San Jose Sharks games
Pittsburgh Penguins games
Stanley Cup Finals
Stanley Cup Finals
Stanley Cup Finals
Stanley Cup Finals
Sports competitions in San Jose, California
Ice hockey competitions in Pittsburgh
2010s in Pittsburgh
Ice hockey competitions in California